Japan have appeared in the FIFA World Cup on seven occasions, the first being in 1998 where they lost all three group games and finished in 31st position. Masashi Nakayama scored Japan's first ever goal in a World Cup match against Jamaica on 26 June 1998 in a 21 defeat. Keisuke Honda became the first Japanese player to score in three world cups: 2010, 2014, 2018.

Japan made their seventh and most recent appearance at the finals at the 2022 tournament in Qatar. In 2018, Japan became the first ever Asian nation to beat a side from South America, after they won 21 against Colombia in the group stage. The team has progressed to the round of 16 on four occasions, 2002 (as join-hosts), 2010, 2018 and 2022.

FIFA World Cup record

By match

Record by opponent

Record players

Top goalscorers

References

External links
Japan at FIFA

 
Countries at the FIFA World Cup